Cremosperma is a genus of flowering plants belonging to the family Gesneriaceae.

Its native range is Panama to Peru.

Species:

Cremosperma anisophyllum 
Cremosperma auriculatum 
Cremosperma castroanum 
Cremosperma congruens 
Cremosperma cotejense 
Cremosperma ecuadoranum 
Cremosperma filicifolium 
Cremosperma hirsutissimum 
Cremosperma humidum 
Cremosperma ignotum 
Cremosperma inversum 
Cremosperma jucundum 
Cremosperma maculatum 
Cremosperma micropecten 
Cremosperma muscicola 
Cremosperma nobile 
Cremosperma occidentale 
Cremosperma parviflorum 
Cremosperma peruvianum 
Cremosperma pusillum 
Cremosperma reldioides 
Cremosperma serratum 
Cremosperma sylvaticum 
Cremosperma veraguanum 
Cremosperma verticillatum

References

Gesnerioideae
Gesneriaceae genera